Lembach may refer to:

Lembach, a commune in Bas-Rhin, northeastern France
Lembach im Mühlkreis, a municipality in Upper Austria, northern Austria
Lembach (Schwalm), a river in Hesse, Germany